The Spirit of Washington dinner train was a dinner train that operated for 15 years from Renton, Washington, with trips heading to Woodinville and back, and then for three months out of Tacoma, with trips heading from Tacoma to Lake Kapowsin near Mount Rainier. On October 29, 2007, the operators of the dinner train announced they would be shutting down the Tacoma route due to poor ridership.

History
The Spirit of Washington dinner train operated for 15 years out of Renton on the Woodinville Subdivision starting in the summer of 1993, with trips heading from a depot in Renton to the Columbia Winery in Woodinville and back. Before this, it ran from shortly after 1986 to 1993 between Yakima and Ellensburg.  In the summer of 2007, the train was forced to change starting locations when the owners of the Woodinville Subdivision, BNSF Railway, would not extend their contract. BNSF allowed King County to move forward with improvements on I-405, which broke the connection between Woodinville and Renton.

Although the operators had wished to move the train to run between Woodinville and Snohomish, negotiations broke down, causing the train to relocate to Tacoma. It operated from August 3, 2007, until October 28 with Tacoma as the starting point. It serviced central Pierce County, on the line going from Tacoma to Lake Kapowsin near Mount Rainier and back.

Cancellation
Due to poor ticket sales after the move to Tacoma, the owners decided to pull the pilot project and close the train down. It was stored in Clark County, Washington, as the owners have suggested they would like to see a dinner train go between Vancouver, Washington, and Mount St. Helens or attempt again to go between Woodinville and Snohomish. Much of the equipment is now owned by Iowa Pacific Holdings, and is used on the Santa Cruz and Monterey Bay Railroad in Watsonville, California.

Footnotes

External links

 Spirit of Washington Dinner Train
 Spirit of Washington Dinner Train closes up shop

Transportation in King County, Washington
History of Renton, Washington
Named passenger trains of the United States